Daniel Harvey may refer to:

 Daniel Harvey (diplomat) (1631–1672), merchant and English ambassador to the Ottoman Empire
 Daniel Harvey (British Army officer) (c. 1664–1732), British Army officer, MP for Dunwich, Clitheroe, and Weymouth and Melcombe Regis
 Daniel Whittle Harvey (1786–1863), British Radical politician, Commissioner of the City of London Police and founder of the Sunday Times
 Daniel Harvey (soccer) (born 1982), former American soccer player
 Dan Harvey, character in the serial Ace of Spades
 Dan Harvey (historian) (born 1959), retired Irish Defence Forces officer and military historian